AccuSystems LLC is an American company headquartered in Pueblo, Colorado that develops, licenses, supports, and sells document imaging software and electronic document management, primarily to the banking and finance industries. In October 2022 AccuSystems was acquired by Alogent, the leader in check and payment processing, digital, online and mobile banking, and process automation solutions for banks and credit unions. Under the Alogent name, the company's unified go-to-market approach will allow financial institutions to better transform their paper-based processes and incoming data into easy-to-use insights through more enhanced digital workflows.

References

External links 
 

Software companies established in 2002
Information technology consulting firms of the United States
Software companies based in Colorado
Banking technology
Document management systems
Business software companies
Content management systems
Software companies of the United States